Impact: Stories of Survival (also known as Did You See That? on streaming platforms) is an American documentary television series that aired from 2002-2005 on the Discovery Health Channel. It was narrated by Thom Beers, Wally Wingert, and Bill Ratner in Seasons 1, 2, and 3, respectively.

The program is based on life-threatening situations in which the victim experienced a moment of impact. Featuring video of the event, reenactments, and interviews with surgeons, doctors, and the victims, Impact takes its viewers through the full process of the victim's impact, treatment and recovery. There is also a segment where a computerized animation shows, in detail, how the impact affected the victim's body. The segment shows how, and to what extent, bones, organs, veins, etc. were injured.

Episodes

Series overview

Season 1 (2002)

Season 2 (2003-04)

Season 3 (2004-05)

Episode status
, the second and third seasons of the program are available for streaming online on Prime Video, Pluto TV and Tubi  under the title Did You See That?.

References

External links

Show page on Original Productions website (archived)

2000s American documentary television series
2000s American reality television series
2002 American television series debuts
2005 American television series endings
Discovery Health Channel original programming
Television series by Original Productions
English-language television shows